Dr Megan Rossi (PhD, RD, APD) (born 10 October 1988) is a dietitian, nutritionist and author specialising in the microbiome. Her PhD in gut health received the Dean's Award top 5% for Outstanding Research Higher Degree.

Rossi founded the website The Gut Health Doctor and The Gut Health Clinic in London. In 2019, she co-founded Bio&Me a food range in the UK.

Early life and education 
One of three children, Rossi was raised by her single mother, a science teacher, on a farm near Cairns in rural Australia.

Rossi studied Dietetics at Queensland University of Technology from 2006 to 2009. After receiving first-class honours, she went on to conduct more research into the field while working as a dietitian at Princess Alexandra Hospital, Brisbane. In 2014, she earned her PhD in gut health from the University of Queensland while also working as a nutritionist for the Australia Olympic Synchronised Swimming team.

Rossi moved to the UK in 2015, where she lives with her husband Thomas and her son Archie.

Career

Research fellow 
Rossi is a Research Fellow at King's College London looking at nutrition-based therapies in gut health, including prebiotics and probiotics, dietary fibres, plant-based diversity, the low-FODMAP diet and food additives. She has published over 50 scientific papers in International peer-reviewed journals.

The Gut Health Doctor 
In 2017, Rossi established an online presence as The Gut Health Doctor', with a focus on linking gut health with other health concerns such as mental health, heart disease, kidney disease and skin conditions.

The Gut Health Clinic 
Rossi founded The Gut Health Clinic for clinical conditions such as IBS, IBD, coeliac disease and other gut disorders, as well as weight management, diabetes, cancer and women's health.

Bio&Me 
Rossi co-founded Bio&Me in 2019, a food range with a focus on gut health. The company was named UK Future Brand of the Year 2021 and has recently received investment from Harry Kane.

Awards 
 2017 British Medical Journal Open Gastroenterology prize 'Best clinical science abstract for oral presentation'.
 2017 British Nutrition Foundation 'Drummond Pump Priming Award'.
 2019 Business Insider's Top 100 Coolest People in Food & Drink.
 2020 Young Australian Achiever of the Year in the UK, from the Australian High Commission for her contribution to science and public education.

Media

Books

Eat Yourself Healthy (Love Your Gut) 
Rossi's debut book, Eat Yourself Healthy (UK, Australia & Europe) and Love Your Gut (US & Canada), was published in September 2019. The book features recipes and advice on IBS and bloating, diagnosing food intolerances, and the relationship between gut health, sleep and exercise. The book was dedicated to her older sister, Justine, who died aged 5 in a playground accident.  It was a Sunday Times bestseller and has been published in 4 languages to date.

Eat More, Live Well 
Eat More, Live Well was published in 2021 by Penguin Books and was also a Sunday Times bestseller. The book suggests eating 30 different plant-based foods a week.

TV 
Rossi has appeared on TV as a gut health commentator for ITV's This Morning show, Lorraine, BBC Morning Live and Sky News

News Media 
In 2022, Rossi started a weekly column in The Daily Mail.

References 

1988 births
Living people